Bedford School Boat Club (BSBC) is a rowing club based on the River Great Ouse at Longholme Boathouse, The Embankment by Butterfly Bridge, Bedford, Bedfordshire

History
The boat club was founded in 1861 making it the sixth oldest school boat club in England. It is owned by Bedford School with rowing being a major school sport. The boathouse is a three sectioned shared building with Bedford Modern School Boat Club and Bedford Girls' School Rowing Club.

The club has won the prestigious Princess Elizabeth Challenge Cup at the Henley Royal Regatta on four occasions and has also won the non championship eights (formerly Child Beale Trophy) at the National Schools' Regatta in 2018.

Honours

Henley Royal Regatta

National Schools' Regatta

British champions

References

Sport in Bedfordshire
Sport in Bedford
Rowing clubs in England
Rowing clubs of the River Great Ouse
Bedford
Scholastic rowing in the United Kingdom
Bedford School